Cyphothroax is a genus of beetles in the family Buprestidae, containing the following species:

 Cyphothroax gibber (Gory, 1841)
 Cyphothroax gibbicollis (Kerremans, 1897)
 Cyphothroax mexicanus Bellamy, 1997
 Cyphothroax oaxacensis Bellamy, 1997
 Cyphothroax palleolatus (Chevrolat, 1835)
 Cyphothroax yucatanensis Bellamy, 1997

References

Buprestidae genera